NTB may refer to:

Organizations
 National Tire and Battery, an American brand of auto service centers
 Nations Trust Bank, a bank in Sri Lanka
 Norsk Telegrambyrå, a Norwegian press agency

Other uses
 Non-tariff barriers to trade
 Notodden Airport, Tuven, Norway, by IATA code
 Nusa Tenggara Barat, (West Nusa Tenggara) a province of Indonesia
 Net-top box, a type of set-top box
 NTB (band), a South Korean boyband